Chinstrap Cove is a cove  north-east of Escarpada Point on the north-west coast of Clarence Island, South Shetland Islands, Antarctica entered northeast of Vaglen Point. The cove has been identified as an Important Bird Area (IBA) by BirdLife International because it supports a large breeding colony of about 20,000 pairs of chinstrap penguins, after which it was named by the UK Joint Services Expedition which visited the site in 1970–1971.  The 74 ha IBA includes the ice-free area south of the cove, extending 2 km along the coast.

References 

Coves of Antarctica
Important Bird Areas of Antarctica
Penguin colonies